The 1997–98 Bikarkeppni karla, named Reunault-bikarinn for sponsorship reasons, was the 32nd edition of the Icelandic Men's Basketball Cup,  won by Grindavík against KFÍ. The competition was managed by the Icelandic Basketball Federation and the final was held in Reykjavík, in the Laugardalshöll on 14 February 1998, and was broadcast live on RÚV.

Participating teams
Thirty-four teams signed up for the Cup tournament.

Bracket

References

External links
1997–98 Tournament results

Men's Cup
1997–98 in European basketball leagues